Dmitry Sergeevich Chelkak (Дмитрий Сергеевич Челкак; born January 1979 in Leningrad) is a Russian mathematician.

Chelkak graduated from Saint Petersburg State University in 1995 with a diploma in 2000 and received his doctorate in 2003 from the Steklov Institute in Saint Petersburg. In 2000 he was with an Euler scholarship in Heidelberg and later in Potsdam. He is a senior researcher at the Steklov Institute in Saint Petersburg and was also a lecturer at the Saint Petersburg State University from 2004 to 2010 and at the Chebyshev Laboratory from 2010 to 2014. He was from 2014 to 2015 at ETH Zurich and from 2015 to 2016 a visiting professor in Geneva.

His research deals with conformal invariance of two-dimensional lattice models at criticality, specifically the Ising models of statistical mechanics, in which he showed universality and conformal invariance at criticality with the Fields medalist Stanislav Smirnov. Chelkak also does research on spectral theory, especially inverse spectral problems of one-dimensional differential operators.

In 1995 he received the gold medal at the International Mathematical Olympiad. In 2004 he was awarded the "Young Mathematician" Prize of the St. Petersburg Mathematical Society. In 2008 he received the Pierre Deligne Prize in Moscow. In 2014 he received the Salem Prize. In 2018 was an invited speaker at the International Congress of Mathematicians in Rio de Janeiro with talk Planar Ising model at criticality: state-of-the-art and perspectives.

Selected publications

References

External links
 mathnet.ru
 
 
 Dmitry Chelkak - Planar Ising model: from combinatorics to CFT and s-embeddings, Lectures 1–4, U. of Virginia Integrable Probability Summer School
 
 
 
 
 

Russian mathematicians
Saint Petersburg State University alumni
Academic staff of Saint Petersburg State University
1979 births
Living people